Chen Qiaonian (2 September 1902 – 6 June 1928) was a Chinese revolutionary and early leader of the Communist Party.

Biography
Chen was born in Anqing Prefecture, Anhui, on 2 September 1902, to Chen Duxiu, a revolutionary socialist, educator, philosopher and author, who co-founded the Communist Party with Li Dazhao in 1921. His siblings were, in order of birth: Chen Yannian, Chen Songnian and Chen Yuying. In 1915, he went to study in Shanghai with his elder brother. Soon after, the two brothers were accepted to Aurora University.

In December 1919, under the influence of the May Fourth Movement, the two brothers went to France to study under a work-study programme. In the winter of 1922, with the approval of the CPC Central Committee, the two brother joined the Communist Party. In March 1923, Chen and others left France for the Soviet Union to study at the Oriental Communist University in Moscow.

Chen returned to China in the winter of 1924 and was appointed director of the Organization Department of the CPC Beijing Municipal Committee. In February 1925, he set up a printing factory in Beijing to print books and periodicals on communism. In October 1925, the CPC Northern District Committee was established, Li Dazhao served as party chief, and Chen served as director of the Organization Department. After the opening of the Party School of the Northern District Party Committee in October 1925, he taught Marxist, class struggle, party building, world revolutionary situation and the general situation of the international communist movement.

In the second half of 1926, Chen was ordered to leave Beijing to work in the south China. From April 27 to May 11, 1927, the 5th National Congress of the Communist Party of China was held in Wuhan, he attended the meeting and was elected a member of the Central Committee. He was made deputy director of the Organization Department of the CPC Central Committee. At the August 7th Meeting of the Communist Party of China, he seriously criticized his father Chen Duxiu's right opportunistic mistakes. Later, he was appointed director of the Organization Department of the CPC Hubei Provincial Committee.

In the winter of 1927, Chen was transferred to Shanghai as director of the Organization Department of the CPC Jiangsu Provincial Committee. On 16 February  1928, the CPC Jiangsu Provincial Committee held a secret meeting at the North Chengdu Road in the British Concession. Chen presided over the meeting. As the traitor Tang Ruilin betrayed, the Kuomintang police suddenly encircled the meeting site, and Chen and the leading comrades of the CPC Jiangsu Provincial Committee were arrested. On 6 June 1928, Kuomintang police shot Chen by the Fenglin Bridge in Shanghai.  and  died with him.

Personal life
Chen married Shi Jingyi, the couple had a son and a daughter, their son named Chen Hongwu, but died young. Their daughter named Chen Hong.

Monuments
There is a road named "Yanqiao Road" after him and his elder brother Chen Yannian in Hefei, Anhui.

References

Bibliography
 

1902 births
1928 deaths
People from Anqing
Republic of China politicians from Anhui
Chinese Communist Party politicians from Anhui
Members of the 5th Central Committee of the Chinese Communist Party